The Southern District is one of the 35 districts of the Lutheran Church–Missouri Synod (LCMS), and encompasses the states of Louisiana, Mississippi and Alabama, as well as the western portion of the Florida Panhandle; the rest of Florida is part of the Florida-Georgia District. The Southern District includes approximately 170 congregations and missions, subdivided into 15 circuits, as well as 14 preschools, 17 elementary schools and 1 high school. Baptized membership in Southern District congregations is approximately 29,391.

The Southern District was formed on February 8, 1882 out of the Western District; portions of the district were separated into the Texas District and the Florida-Georgia District in 1906 and 1948 respectively. In 1963, 54 black congregations which were part of the Synodical Conference's Mission Program were merged into the Southern District; 33 such congregations in central Alabama were consolidated into 10 congregations shortly thereafter. About 40 existing congregations are historically black congregations, and most of the black pastors and teachers in the LCMS originated in this area.

District offices are located in Slidell, Louisiana.  Delegates from each congregation meet in convention every three years to elect the district president, Vice Presidents and other officers. In 2018 Rev. Eric Johnson was elected as district president.  

Concordia College Alabama in Selma, founded in 1922 as part of the Synodical Conference Mission Program part of the LCMS Concordia University System, was located within the district through its closure in 2018.

Presidents
Rev. Timotheus Stiemke, 1882–88
Rev. Gotthilf Heinrich Wilhelm Birkmann, 1888–91
Rev. Gottfried Johann Wegener, 1891–1927
Rev. Martin W. H. Holls, 1927–54
Rev. Paul W. Streufert, 1954–57
Rev. Edgar W. Homrighausen, 1957-69
Rev. Lothar Kleinhans, 1969–70
Rev. John E. Ellermann, 1970-78
Rev. Richard H. Meyer, 1978-88
Rev. Orval D. Mueller, 1988-2003
Rev. Kurtis D. Schultz, 2003-2018
Rev. Eric C. Johnson, 2018-present

References

External links
Southern District web site
LCMS: Southern District
LCMS Congregation Directory
Erster Synodal-Bricht des Südlichen Distrikts der deutschen evang.-luth. Synode von Missouri Ohio u. a. Staaten Anno domini 1882-1895
Berhandlunger der eslsten Jahresversammlung des Südlichen Distrikts der deutschen evang.-lutherischen Synode von Missouri, Ohio, und anderen Staaten (1897-1910)

Lutheran Church–Missouri Synod districts
Protestantism in Alabama
Protestantism in Florida
Protestantism in Louisiana
Christianity in Mississippi
Religious organizations established in 1882
Lutheran districts established in the 19th century
Religion in the Southern United States